Company police, also called private police, are privately paid law enforcement officers who work for private security companies or private military companies rather than a municipal, county, state, or national agency.

Malaysia
In Malaysia, auxiliary police refers to sworn security police officers serving in autonomous government agencies and key government-linked companies/entities such as Northport (Malaysia) Bhd (Northport), Petroleum Nasional Berhad (Petronas), the Malaysian Federal Reserve Bank (Bank Negara), the National Anti-Drug Agency (Agensi Anti-Dadah Kebangsaan - AADK), the Federal Land Development Agency (FELDA) and the Inland Revenue Board (Lembaga Hasil Dalam Negeri); and other institutions with semi-governmental interests. Such institutions include the National Savings Bank (Bank Simpanan Nasional - BSN), Malayan Railways Limited (Keretapi Tanah Melayu Berhad - KTMB), Pos Malaysia Holdings Berhad (the national postal service), Malaysia Airports Holdings Berhad (the largest Malaysian airport operator), the North-South Highway Project (Projek Lebuhraya Utara Selatan - PLUS), Tenaga Nasional Berhad (the national power service) and other similar strategic organizations.

Most of these organizations have already been privatized, but are allowed to maintain an auxiliary police unit. Under special circumstances, auxiliary police units have also been established by private companies with no government interests at all such as the force maintained by Resorts World Berhad (RWB), the company that operates the popular resort and casino at Genting Highlands.  At present, there are 153 government agencies, statutory bodies and private companies authorized to operate their own auxiliary police units, with a total strength of 40,610 personnel.

Singapore

In Singapore, auxiliary police officers are security police appointed under Section 92(1) or (2) of the Police Force Act 2004 and are vested with all the power, protection and immunities of a Police Officer of corresponding rank and are licensed to carry firearms when carrying out their duties. These armed auxiliary police officers (APO) are full-time paid employees of their respective companies, and are not directly affiliated to the Singapore Police Force. They are appointed as auxiliary police officers only after attending and passing a residential course, the curriculum of which is set by the Security Industry Regulatory Department of the Singapore Police Force. Each APO is issued with a warrant card signed by the Commissioner of Police of the Singapore Police Force.

United Kingdom
The term was formerly used in the United Kingdom for in-house security guards at factories and plants. Despite the name, these men did not have police powers. It has been illegal for police officers to work part-time as security guards in the United Kingdom since 1934.

There are ten companies whose employees are sworn in as constables under section 79 of the Harbours, Docks, and Piers Clauses Act 1847. As a result, they have the full powers of a constable on any land owned by the harbour, dock, or port and at any place within one mile of any owned land. Additionally, there are also some forces established by specific legislation such as the Port of Tilbury Police (Port of London Act 1968).

United States
Company police exist in some states in the United States.  If they have attended the basic law enforcement officer's training academy in the state in which they work, they may be granted full police powers pursuant to state law.

Virginia
The Commonwealth of Virginia has a statutory designation of Special Conservator of the Peace (SCOP). These officers have police powers through private employers on public and contract property and may carry firearms. The training is over 100 hours for armed SCOP's and 24 for unarmed. The officers must go through the Virginia Department of Criminal Justice Services, pass a background investigation, drug screen, proof of liability insurance, fingerprints, fees, successful completion of all training and get then be issued a commission with boundaries of jurisdiction specified by a judge in order to be commissioned.

Washington, D.C.
Washington, D.C. has "Special Police Officer" (SPO) commissions for security guards who may need to make minor arrests and they must complete a brief training course. SPOs oftentimes work for private corporations within Washington D.C., fulfilling the role of "company police" within the district.

The jurisdiction of SPOs are sometimes limited to the property which they have been hired to protect, however many SPOs work in a part-time capacity to supplement the salaries they earn as full-time city police or county officers. This inherently grants them citywide or county-wide jurisdiction if the property they are employed on is located within the respective jurisdiction of their full-time public service police department.

North Carolina
North Carolina founded its company police program in the late 1800s to give textile mills and employee villages (housing and company store, offices, etc.) internal police protection and the powers of Company Police's authority is within their jurisdiction unless in "continuous and immediate" pursuit. Currently governmental facilities, factories, schools, mill towns, hotels, condominium units and private or gated communities that have proprietary or contracted special police have jurisdiction, in which the employer has ownership or control property, to make arrests for both felonies and misdemeanors and to charge for infractions. North Carolina requires Company Police to meet and maintain NC standards set forth for all state sworn law enforcement officers and additionally must pass a state-administered written exam specific to company police. These law enforcement officers and their respective agencies are regulated by the Company Police Administrator through North Carolina's Department of Justice. The three categories of company police are: Campus, Rail Road and Special Police Officer

"(1)        Campus Police Officers - Only those company police officers who are employed by any college or university that is a constituent institution of the University of North Carolina or any private college or university that is licensed or exempted from licensure as prescribed by G.S. 116-15, and who are employed by a campus police agency that was licensed pursuant to this Chapter prior to the enactment of Chapter 74G of the General Statutes.

(2)        Railroad Police Officers - Those company police officers who are employed by a certified rail carrier and commissioned as company police officers under this Chapter.

(3)        Special Police Officers - All company police officers not designated as a campus police officer or railroad police officer."

Pennsylvania
See Coal and Iron Police

Others
In the majority of the states in the U.S., actively employed state-certified peace officers, regardless of the capacity in which they are employed (private, public, company, security, campus, etc.), have the ability to pursue and apprehend someone suspected of committing a criminal or violation offense or a felony while on employer or contracted property outside of their normal jurisdiction. They can also detain or make a citizen's arrest if off employer's property or contract sites, then turn the detained violator over to local law enforcement authorities.

There are generally two types of Company Police:
"in-house" or "proprietary" (i.e. employed by the same company or organization they protect, such as a mall, theme park, property owners association or casino); 
"contract", working for a private security company which protects many locations and or multiple businesses;
"governmental", working for a special governmental agency: public hospital, public park, school district, museum, fairground, etc.
Note: in North Carolina, personnel of Private Police must meet all police officer standards, including but not limited to drug screen, psychological evaluation, annual in-service courses of 24 hours, firearms training and qualification, medical exam, background and completion of a one-year probationary period of employment following successful completion of the state mandated 600+ hour NC Basic Law Enforcement Training (BLET) offered at various academies and community colleges statewide. NC SPO's must also pass a SPO exam from the State Justice Department and may be required to pass a polygraph exam. The officers in NC are titled as Special Police, Railroad Police or Company Police. Private college "Campus Police" were placed under separate legislation in North Carolina, after originally being special police. Police of the NC State University System were initially under the company police act but were later legislative changes made them regular police with all powers of regular city police, including a one-mile extraterritorial jurisdiction (ETJ) from contiguous campus boundaries. UNC system police now are by title police vs. company, special, campus or railroad, which are titles that must be adjoined to all vehicles, badges, patches where the word "police" is visible. NC railroad police have not only extended SPO statewide police powers, they additionally have federal commissions as railroad agents (NCGS 74E, the "Company Police Act").

References

External links
 Company police article
 Company police at NC DOJ

Law enforcement in the United States
Law enforcement units
Law enforcement in Malaysia
Law enforcement in Singapore
Law enforcement in the United Kingdom
Private police